Anagnostou is a patronymic, occupational Greek family name derived from the Greek word αναγνώστης (anagnóstis, "reader"). Since Byzantine times an anagnost was responsible for reading religious texts at a liturgy.  
Notable people with this name include:
 Chrissovalantis Anagnostou (born 1975), German-Greek football player
 Fani Anagnostou, French-Greek dentist and researcher
 Gerasimos Anagnostou (1880–?), Greek sports shooter
 Ioanna Boukouvala-Anagnostou (1904–1992), Greek writer
 Ioannis Anagnostou, Greek chess master
 Sabine Anagnostou, German medical historian and pharmacist
 Sergio Pérez Anagnostou (born 1979), Spanish basketball player

Television 
 Hector Anagnostou, fictional character on the ANT1 television series Erotas
 Myrtle Anagnostou, fictional character on the ANT1 television series Erotas

Greek-language surnames
Surnames